Belmont is a historic plantation house where Nat Turner's slave rebellion took place. Located near Capron, Southampton County, Virginia, it was built about 1790 and is a -story, frame dwelling sheathed in weatherboard.  It has a side gable roof with dormers and sits on a brick foundation.  It has a single pile, central-hall plan and features a Chinese lattice railing on the second story.  Also on the property are a contributing smokehouse and office.  At Belmont, on the morning of August 23, 1831, Nat Turner's slave rebellion was effectively suppressed.

It was listed on the National Register of Historic Places in 1973.

References

Plantation houses in Virginia
Houses on the National Register of Historic Places in Virginia
Houses completed in 1790
Houses in Southampton County, Virginia
National Register of Historic Places in Southampton County, Virginia
Nat Turner